Aubigny-sur-Nère is a town and commune in the Cher department in the administrative region of Centre-Val de Loire, France.

Geography

History
First known as Albinacum in Roman times, the commune was established as a royal town in 1189 by Philip II.
This is the location by which the Duke of Richmond and Gordon gets his honorific title, as the Duke of Aubigny.
In 1419, John Stewart of Darnley, a junior member of the House of Stuart, arrived in France with a large contingent of Scottish soldiers, to fight for Charles VII. He was awarded many titles, among them the Lordship of Aubigny. The family stayed here for 400 years.

Links with Scotland
Aubigny is a common tourist destination for Scots and others from the United Kingdom. The commune is very attached to the Auld Alliance, due to its 400 years of French-Scottish history and is the only place in France that still celebrates this long association each year, on Bastille Day. It is twinned with the Scottish town of Haddington, East Lothian.

Population

Places of interest
 The church of St.Martin, dating from the thirteenth century.
 The fifteenth-century Château d'Aubigny.
 The sixteenth-century Chateau de la Verrerie.
 Several sixteenth-century houses.
 A tower, one of few remains of the original town fortifications.
 A museum dedicated to Marguerite Audoux, (1863–1937), a writer who lived nearby.

Personalities

 John Stewart, Earl of Buchan (1381–1424)
 Bernard Stewart, Lord of Aubigny (1452–1508)
 Robert Stewart, Lord of Aubigny (1470–1544)
 Louise de Kérouaille, Duchess of Portsmouth and Aubigny (1649–1734)
 Théophile Moreux, astronomer, is buried here.

Twin towns
  Haddington, East Lothian, Scotland, United Kingdom
  Plopana, Romania
  Oxford, Mississippi, United States
  Vlotho, Germany
  Villeneuve-de-la-Raho

See also
Sologne
Communes of the Cher department

References

External links

Official town website 
Regional Tourism website 
Site of the Aéroclub d'Aubigny-sur-Nère 
Aubigny-sur-Nère on the departement website 
SISTER CITIES: OXFORD AND AUBIGNY

Communes of Cher (department)
Berry, France